Mahadeo Devale was the Mayor of Mumbai (2002 - February 2005). He was handpicked by Shiv Sena supremo Bal Thackeray for the post.

References

Mayors of Mumbai
Marathi politicians
Living people
Shiv Sena politicians
Year of birth missing (living people)
Maharashtra local politicians